Chandrami چندرامیis an ancient village of Sadiqabad Tehsil in the Rahim Yar Khan District of Pakistan which is derived from Hindi language as Chander (Moon) and worship of Ram (God/Bhagwan) i.e. a huge moon and vast shinning moonlight, but its original name was Chand (Moon) and Rani (princesses)چاند رانی by Ameer of State Bahawalpur Nawab Muhammad Sadiq Sb.(L).
It is located to the north-west of Sadiqabad, the tehsil capital. Now Chandrami village has built its town and become more famous for its infrastructure just like installation of jazz company mobile tower in it.

An ancient times familiar with Rajpoot educated families as 'Molvi' educational title of Rajpoot family and other designates title of this family as 'Khan Sahib' from Khan Bahadur of British Army. Most popular personality of this family 'Molvi Noor Ahmed Khan (L) was landlord and old police inspector in 1905. His nephew 'Molvi Ghulam Muhammad Khan' was old humble landlord of Chandrami village. His elder son Khan Ghulam Mustafa Khan Advocate has been efforts and approved the Railway Station, water supply, paved roads and electricity types of different infrastructure projects since 1975. His elder son Muhammad Adnan Mustafa Khan Advocate has been authorised as a 'Numberdar of village Latki and Dagga Ahmed Khan by Gov't. of Pakistan from forefathers Molvi Ghulam Muhammad Khan designation. Now these family members are still here and other these family members are performing their jobs as Minister/Secretary levels in Pakistan and some are doing businesses in abroad countries.

Here there is ethnic and religious diversity. People from different sects and religions live here. Most are Muslims and minority are Christian & Hindus (thori and maingwal).

Chandrami is located between Sadiqabad and Rahim Yar Khan District.

People here speak almost different their native languages just like their families as such: Punjabi (Muslims Rajpoot, Arain, Bhatti, Jutt, Rana, and layman's Christians), Urdu from Educated  Rajpoot families (almost educated/semi educated  people), Saraiki by vast Warind casts (riasti/states), Sindhi (latki), Balochi (marhattay/labourers), Malwarri (Muslims Mahar and Hindu maingwal, thori) Pushto by Pathans.etc.

References

Populated places in Rahim Yar Khan District